Jathara is a Telugu film starring Chiranjeevi.

Cast
 Chiranjeevi
 Sreedhar
 Nagabhushanam
 Leelavathi
 Suvarna
 Indrani
 Mada Venkateswara Rao
 Prasad Babu
 Hari babu
 P. L. Narayana
 G.S.R. Murthy

Soundtrack

References

External links

1980 films
1980s Telugu-language films